Interstate 670 (I-670) is an Interstate Highway in the US state of Ohio that passes through Columbus  connecting I-70 west of Downtown Columbus with I-270 and U.S. Route 62 (US 62) near the eastern suburb of Gahanna. I-670 provides access to John Glenn Columbus International Airport and intersects State Route 315 (SR 315) and I-71 downtown. The section between SR 315 and I-71 is commonly referred to by locals as the "North Innerbelt"; the rest of the Innerbelt consists of SR 315 (west), I-70 (south), and I-71 (east and south).

History
In the late 1970s, the Ohio Department of Transportation (ODOT) was unable to complete the Spring–Sandusky streets interchange, linking both sections of the highway, due to budget shortfalls and environmental regulations, leaving I-670 the only uncompleted Interstate in Ohio. Two decades passed before work began on the last remaining section, bridging the gap between the two completed sections. Work on this section also included the High Street cap, a cut-and-cover bridge over the highway featuring shops and restaurants. I-670 was finally completed in 2003.

In June 2018, a $60-million (equivalent to $ in ) construction project began on an active traffic management system known as SmartLane. The system, running between I-71 and I-270, repurposed a shoulder lane and installed digital overhead signs that would inform motorists when the lane would open and the current speed limit to help reduce congestion. In addition, the interchange with I-270 was reconfigured. The management system opened to traffic in October 2019.

Route description
West of I-71, I-670 passes around both sides of Fort Hayes with two two-way roadways. The south roadway carries the eastbound main lanes and the westbound entrance ramps from I-71 north and SR 3 (Cleveland Avenue), while the north roadway carries the westbound main lanes and the eastbound entrance from US 23 north (4th Street) and High Street.

Exit list

References

6 (Ohio)
70-6
70-6 Ohio
Interstate 70-6
Transportation in Franklin County, Ohio